The Jazz Singer is an album by Neil Diamond from 1980, which served as the soundtrack album to the 1980 remake of the film The Jazz Singer. The soundtrack was released in November 1980 originally on Capitol Records, instead of his then-usual Columbia Records, because the film was produced by EMI Films, owned by the parent company of the label for which the soundtrack was released. The soundtrack was re-released in February 1996 on Columbia Records in the United States and Sony elsewhere.  After Diamond signed with Capitol Records, this album was reissued by Capitol globally in 2014.

The film's reviews were negative, earning Diamond the first Razzie for Worst Actor at the 1st Golden Raspberry Awards, but made a modest profit at the box office, grossing almost double its budget. However, its soundtrack was a huge success and became Neil Diamond's biggest selling album in the United States, selling over 5 million copies there and reaching #3 on the pop albums chart. This would mark the second time a Neil Diamond soundtrack outperformed the movie it came from (after Jonathan Livingston Seagull). Three songs from the album became top ten hits on the Billboard Hot 100, with "Love on the Rocks", "Hello Again" and "America" reaching Nos. 2, 6, and 8, respectively.

Track listing

Charts

Certifications

Personnel
 Neil Diamond – guitar, lead vocals
 Richard Bennett – acoustic and electric guitars
 Doug Rhone – guitar, backing vocals
 Alan Lindgren – synthesizers, pianos, orchestra arrangements and conductor (1, 4, 5, 8, 10, 11)
 Tom Hensley – keyboards, pianos, orchestra arrangements and conductor (5, 7, 12)
 Reinie Press – bass
 Dennis St. John – drums, music director
 Vince Charles – percussion
 King Errisson – percussion
 Assa Drori – concertmaster
 Jimmy Getzoff – concertmaster
 Sid Sharp – concertmaster
 John Rosenberg – orchestra contractor
 Bob Gaudio – vocal arrangements
 Donny Gerard – backing vocals
 Marilyn O'Brien – backing vocals
 Linda Press – backing vocals, vocal arrangements
 H.L. Voelker – backing vocals
 Luther Waters – backing vocals
 Oren Waters – backing vocals
 Choir – Timothy Allan Bullara, Jeremy C. Lipton, Dale D. Morich, Yoav Steven Paskowitz, Boyd H. Schlaefer, Mark H. Stevens, David Teisher and James Gregory Wilburn

Production
 Producer – Bob Gaudio
 Production Coordination – Beatrice E. Marks and Alison Zanetos
 Production Assistant – Rita Zak
 Recording Engineer – Andy Bloch
 Assistant Engineers – Bill Benton, David Bianco, Jack Crymes, Brad Gilderman, Mark Eshelman, Larry Rebhun and Rick Ruggieri.
 Recorded at Arch Angel Studios and Record Plant (Los Angeles, CA); Sunset Sound Recorders and Cherokee Studios (Hollywood, CA); Dawnbreaker Studios (San Fernando, CA).
 Mixed by Ron Hitchcock
 Mastered by Mike Reese, Doug Sax and Lois Walker at The Mastering Lab (Los Angeles, CA).
 Art Direction and Design – David Kirschner
 Contributing Artwork – Michael Donaldson, David Kirschner, Ron Larson, John Squire and Jan Weinberg.
 Photography – Larry Barbier
 Equipment – Ed Lever / Canyon Recorders

Notes 

Neil Diamond soundtracks
1980s film soundtrack albums
1980 soundtrack albums
Capitol Records soundtracks
Columbia Records soundtracks
Albums produced by Bob Gaudio
Albums recorded at Sunset Sound Recorders
Single-artist film soundtracks